Peter Whitfield Hamm (born September 20, 1947, in Buffalo, New York) is an American former baseball pitcher who played from 1970 to 1971 for the Minnesota Twins of Major League Baseball (MLB).

External links
, or Retrosheet, or Pura Pelota (Venezuelan Winter League)

1947 births
Living people
Auburn Twins players
Baseball players from Buffalo, New York
Charlotte Hornets (baseball) players
Evansville Triplets players
Major League Baseball pitchers
Minnesota Twins players
Navegantes del Magallanes players
American expatriate baseball players in Venezuela
Orlando Twins players
Portland Beavers players
Red Springs Twins players
Stanford Cardinal baseball players
Stanford University alumni
St. Cloud Rox players
Trois-Rivières Aigles players